First Comes the Night is the twelfth studio album by American rock musician Chris Isaak, released through Vanguard Records in Australia on October 23, 2015 and worldwide on November 13, 2015.

Track listing

Personnel
 Chris Isaak - lead vocals, guitar
 Kenney Dale Johnson - drums, vocals
 Rowland Salley - bass, vocals
 Hershel Yatovitz - guitar
 Scott Plunkett - keyboards, piano, organ
 Rafael Padilla - percussion
Technical
 Chris Isaak, Dave Cobb, Mark Needham, Paul Worley - production

Charts

References

External links
 Official website

2015 albums
Chris Isaak albums
Albums produced by Dave Cobb
Albums produced by Paul Worley
Vanguard Records albums